Highway 727 is a highway in the Canadian province of Saskatchewan. It runs from Highway 640 near Cupar to Highway 56 near Pasqua and Echo Lakes on the Standing Buffalo Indian Reserve.

See also
Roads in Saskatchewan
Transportation in Saskatchewan

References 

727